Lerista walkeri, also known commonly as the coastal Kimberley slider and Walker's lerista, is a species of skink, a lizard in the family Scincidae. The species is endemic to Australia.

Etymology
The specific name, walkeri, is in honor of British entomologist James John Walker.

Geographic range
L. walkeri is found in Western Australia, Australia.

Habitat
The preferred natural habitats of L. walkeri are forest, shrubland, and rocky areas.

Description
L. walkeri has only two digits on each of its four feet.

Reproduction
L. walkeri is oviparous.

References

Further reading
Boulenger GA (1891). "Description of a new Scincoid Lizard from North-western Australia". Annals and Magazine of Natural History, Sixth Series 8: 405. (Lygosoma walkeri, new species).
Cogger HG (2014). Reptiles and Amphibians of Australia, Seventh Edition. Clayton, Victoria, Australia: CSIRO Publishing. xxx + 1,033 pp. .
Skinner A, Lee MSY, Hutchinson MN (2008). "Rapid and repeated limb loss in a clade of scincid lizards". BMC Evolutionary Biology 8: 310 [9 pages]. (Lerista walkeri, Figure 1).
Wilson, Steve; Swan, Gerry (2013). A Complete Guide to Reptiles of Australia, Fourth Edition. Sydney: New Holland Publishers. 522 pp. .

Lerista
Reptiles described in 1891
Taxa named by George Albert Boulenger